Elements: An International Magazine of Mineralogy, Geochemistry, and Petrology is a bimonthly peer-reviewed scientific journal published by 18 scientific societies: Mineralogical Society of America, Mineralogical Society of Great Britain and Ireland, Mineralogical Association of Canada, Clay Minerals Society,  Geochemical Society, European Association of Geochemistry, International Association of GeoChemistry, Société Française de Minéralogie et de Cristallographie, Association of Applied Geochemists, International Association of Geoanalysts, Polskie Towarzystwo Mineralogiczne (Mineralogical Society of Poland), Sociedad Española de Mineralogía (Spanish Mineralogical Society), Swiss Society of Mineralogy and Petrology, Meteoritical Society, Japan Association of Mineralogical Sciences and the International Association on the Genesis of Ore Deposits. It was established in January 2005.

The editors-in-chief are Richard  J. Harrison (2020-2022), Rebecca A. Lange (2021-2023), and Janne Blichert-Toft (2022-2024).
The journal covers all aspects of  mineralogy, geochemistry, and petrology. Each issue is devoted to a particular topic and contains invited review articles, as well as society news and book reviews.

Abstracting and indexing
The journal is abstracted and indexed in Chemical Abstracts Service, Current Contents/Physical, Chemical & Earth Sciences, Ei Compendex, GEOBASE, Science Citation Index Expanded, and Scopus. According to the Journal Citation Reports, the journal has a 2020 impact factor of 3.632.

References

External links

Mineralogy
Petrology
Geology journals
English-language journals
Bimonthly journals
Publications established in 2005
Academic journals published by learned and professional societies
Geochemical Society